Women Superstars United (WSU; formerly Women Superstars Uncensored) is an American, New Jersey based women's professional wrestling promotion which held its first event in 2006. Shows combine wrestling interspersed with both serious and comedic storylines. The company tapes two DVDs worth of material during weekend shows. Although many of the shows are promoted solely by WSU, they have also worked with National Wrestling Superstars. As of October 2009, the promotion has a working agreement with Dragon Gate USA.

WSU is considered one of the top women's wrestling organizations in the United States. The company claims to be "the leader in women's wrestling in the northeast" and to promote more cards than any other women's wrestling company in the country.

Championships
As of December 14, 2019

Tournaments

WSU Hall of Fame
In 2009, WSU created a hall of fame with an inaugural class of three members.

Inductees

Pay-per-view events
On November 6, 2010, WSU aired their first internet pay-per-view (iPPV) event on GoFightLive.TV.

References

External links
 Official website

2007 establishments in New Jersey
American independent professional wrestling promotions based in New Jersey
Women's professional wrestling promotions